The Team relay competition at the 2022 World Aquatics Championships was held on 26 June 2022.

Results
The race was started at 13:00.

References

Team
Team open water